= Bhāvasena =

Jain philosopher

Bhāvasena was a Jain philosopher of the Digambara school who lived in South India during the late 13th and early 14th century. His Viśvatattvaprkāśa is particularly important for its systematic questioning of the validity of the Vedic tradition. In his Collected papers on Jaina studies, P. S. Jaini gave an account of Bhāvasena and his Muktivicāra and Bhuktivicāra, with translations. Somewhat later, Eiichi Yamaguchi, in his report on the 14th world Sanskrit conference in Kyoto, 2009, refers to a paper delivered by Robert Zydenbos on Bhāvasena's Viśvatattvaprkāśa, but that work remains unpublished.
